The Beiteddine Festival is an annual summer festival that takes place in Beiteddine Palace in Beiteddine, Lebanon. 
It was launched amidst war and destruction in the middle of the 80's. It came as an act of faith in Lebanon's cultural specificity and its power of creativity and artistic freedom. It was a call for normality in the middle of the chaos and madness of the civil war.
It was established in 1984 with local artistic performances and it gradually started having regional and international performances. Over the years, it has included concerts or performances related to classical music, dance, theatre, opera, jazz, and modern world music.

The Palace
The festival takes place in the large 200-year-old Beiteddine Palace in the Chouf Mountains, in Lebanon.

Festival Highlights

Roberto Alagna
Kadim Al Sahir
Charles Aznavour
George Benson
Caracalla Dance Theatre
Mariah Carey
José Carreras
Phil Collins
Plácido Domingo
Montserrat Caballé
Juan Diego Flores
Anna Netrebko
Majida El Roumi
Fairuz
Garou
Gilberto Gil
Sylvie Guillem
Elton John
Patricia Kaas
Marcel Khalifé
Diana Krall
Ricky Martin
Katie Melua
Joss Stone
Il Divo
Notre-Dame de Paris
UB40

References

External links
Beiteddine Festival Official Site

See also 
 Culture of Lebanon

Music festivals in Lebanon
Summer festivals
1984 establishments in Lebanon
Annual events in Lebanon
Music festivals established in 1984
Summer events in Lebanon